Paul Neill (September 6, 1882 – October 1968) was an American electrical engineer at Bell Labs in the 1940s. He is credited with helping to invent the BNC, TNC, and Type N connectors used for microwave and RF communications. He joined Bell in 1916 after spending 12 years at the Westinghouse Electric Company. He retired from Bell on September 30, 1947.

See also
RF connector
Carl Concelman

References

External links

1882 births
1968 deaths
Scientists at Bell Labs
American electrical engineers
20th-century American inventors